Dr John MacWhirter FRSE PRCPE (1783–1854) was a 19th-century Scottish physician who served as president of the Royal College of Physicians of Edinburgh from 1831 to 1833.

Life

Little is known of his early life other than he studied medicine at St Andrews University. He began working in the Indian Medical Service in 1803, attached to the East India Company, being promoted to full Surgeon in 1815. He received his doctorate from St Andrew University in 1816 on his return to Scotland and set up practice as a GP in Edinburgh. In 1824 he was elected a Fellow of the Royal Society of Edinburgh his proposer being Thomas Allan. In 1826 he was elected a member of the Aesculapian Club. In 1827 he was president of the Harveian Society.

At the time of his presidency he lived at 4 Ainslie Place in Edinburgh.

He died at home, 50 Moray Place in Edinburgh's affluent West End on 13 December 1854.

Artistic recognition

He was painted by George Chinnery around 1820.

Family

He married Harriet Ann Reid in Calcutta in 1810.

References

1783 births
1854 deaths
Alumni of the University of St Andrews
Presidents of the Royal College of Physicians of Edinburgh
Fellows of the Royal Society of Edinburgh